The National public school, Hazaribagh   was established in 1977 and is located near the centre of Hazaribagh town. The school is co-educational and has over a thousand students. The school is affiliated to CBSE, New Delhi. Although the language of instruction is English, Hindi and Sanskrit are also given equal importance. Computer education is compulsory from class I onwards.

History 
National public had a modest start in 1977, and by 1988 was more established. Its first batch for matriculation through CBSE board was started in 2003 with a poor response, but it starts rapid growth in due course and starts to secure 80+ percentage marks and by 2005 its students start to come under district toppers. The school is managed by L.K.C Memorial Educational Society, Hazaribagh The data has been taken from National Public School but contact number is taken from DPS Hazaribag (Near Gulmohar School)

References

External links
 Facebook page

Hazaribagh
Schools in Jharkhand
1977 establishments in Bihar
Educational institutions established in 1977